Dubai Internet City (DIC) is an information technology and business park created by the Government of Dubai as a free economic zone and a strategic base for companies targeting regional emerging markets in Dubai, United Arab Emirates.

Overview
DIC presently has over one and half million square feet of prime commercial office space, in which over 1,400 companies with over 10,000 workers are based. There are 25 low, mid, and high-rise office structures in the area.

The economic rules of DIC allow companies to avail themselves of a number of ownership, taxation and customs related benefits which are guaranteed by law for a period of 50 years. One model of operation includes 100% foreign ownership, similar to those prevailing in other designated economic zones in the United Arab Emirates. These freedoms have led many global information technology firms, such as Facebook, LinkedIn, Google, Dell, Intel, Huawei, Samsung, SAP, Microsoft, IBM, Oracle Corporation, Tata Consultancy, 3M, Sun Microsystems, Cisco, HP, Nokia, Cognizant, Accenture, and MicroStrategy as well as UAE-based companies such as Ducont, to move their regional base to the DIC. DIC is located adjacent to other industrial clusters such as Dubai Media City and Dubai Knowledge Park (formerly Dubai Knowledge Village).

History
Dubai Internet City, a member of Dubai Holding subsidiary TECOM Investments, was founded in October 1999, and it opened its doors in October 2000.

Location

Dubai Internet City is about 25 kilometres south of downtown Dubai city, on Sheikh Zayed Road between Dubai and Abu Dhabi. It is located adjacent to Dubai Marina, Jumeirah Beach Residence and the well-known Palm Jumeirah, areas which are rapidly becoming three of the most exclusive (and expensive) residential areas of Dubai. DIC is less than 1 km from the sea coast and is near several five-star hotels. The nearest metro station the eponymous Dubai Internet City station on the Red Line of the Dubai Metro, located on Sheikh Zayed Road.

See also
Dubai Internet City (Dubai Metro)
Dubai Media City
Dubai Knowledge Park
Dubai Science Park
Dubai Holding
SmartCity

References

External links

Dubai Holding official website
Dubai Internet City article

2000 establishments in the United Arab Emirates
Internet city
Internet City
Internet City
Internet City
Government-owned companies of the United Arab Emirates
Science parks in the United Arab Emirates
Free-trade zones of the United Arab Emirates
Information technology in the United Arab Emirates
Information technology places